Michael Blakey (born February 23, 1953) is an American anthropologist who specializes in physical anthropology and its connection to the history of African Americans. Since 2001, he has been a National Endowment for the Humanities professor at the College of William & Mary, where he directs the Institute for Historical Biology. Previously, he was a professor at Howard University and the curator of Howard University's Montague Cobb Biological Anthropology Laboratory.

Early life and education
Blakey obtained his B.A. in Anthropology from Howard University in 1978, and an M.A. (1980) and a Ph.D. (1985) from the University of Massachusetts Amherst. He served as president of the Association of Black Anthropologists from 1987 to 1989.

Career

African burial ground in Manhattan
Blakey was a director of the New York African Burial Ground Project, now the African Burial Ground National Monument. According to Blakey, the existence of this burial ground in what is now Lower Manhattan (where between 10 and 20 thousand people of African descent were buried in the eighteenth century) was evidence of "false historical representation" and exposed as a myth the idea that New York and the northern states were not slave-owning areas. Blakey says that, in general, educated Americans had the impression that slavery played little role in the development of the northern American colonies in general, and New York City in particular. Blakey's research helps dispel those myths, and offers a "compelling portrait of the exploitation and violence suffered by enslaved Africans, and equally to the active resistance of people of African descent to this exploitation and violence". Blakey concluded that these slaves faced "brutal working conditions, premature rates of mortality, and excessive workloads, while nutritional deficiencies were common among young children."

Blakey's research team examined 27 skeletons that had filed or "culturally modified" teeth, which was considered a strong indication of African birth. Previously, only nine such skeletons had been discovered in the Americas. It is likely that these individuals had come to New York previous to 1808, when the importation of slaves from Africa was banned. Blakey's team examined more than 1.5 million artifacts discovered at the site, which included everything "from pottery and glassware to tools and children's toys". His research determined that approximately half of the African people buried at the site were children. After his research was completed, the skeletal remains were reinterred at the site "in 400 hand-carved mahogany coffins" in a 2003 ceremony described as "joyous and bitter all at once".

Analysis of racism
Blakey says that physical anthropology has a "pattern of denial" about racism, which has its origins in the dominant view that social differences are due to the inherent characteristics of individuals, and less on political and economic factors. Blakey maintains that the history of physical anthropology has been "sterilized", downplaying the role that eugenics and scientific racism had in its origins.

Discussing a museum exhibit about race at the Science Museum of Virginia, Blakey criticized the contemporary reluctance to discuss racism, maintaining that "it has become illegitimate to talk about racism" and that failing to do so is "the new racism".

References

External links
Blakey on the New York African Burial Ground Project
Blakey interviewed on National Public Radio in 2007
African Burial Ground National Monument

1953 births
American anthropologists
African-American archaeologists
College of William & Mary faculty
Howard University faculty
Living people
Physical anthropologists
University of Massachusetts Amherst College of Social and Behavioral Sciences alumni
American archaeologists